The Good Old Boys is a 1995 American Western television film that was the TV directorial debut of Tommy Lee Jones. Jones also starred and co-wrote the teleplay, which is based on the book of the same name by Elmer Kelton.

Plot 
An aging cowboy must choose between his desire to remain free and the responsibilities of maintaining a family.

Cast
 Tommy Lee Jones – Hewey Calloway
 Terry Kinney – Walter Calloway
 Frances McDormand – Eve Calloway
 Sam Shepard – Snort Yarnell
 Sissy Spacek – Spring Renfro
 Joaquin Jackson – Sheriff Wes Wheeler
 Wilford Brimley – C.C. Tarpley
 Matt Damon – Cotton Calloway
 Walter Olkewicz – Frank (Fat) Gervin
 Blayne Weaver – Tommy Calloway
 Larry Mahan – Blue Hannigan
 Bruce McGill – City Marshall
 Margaret Bowman – Mrs. Faversham

Production 
Filming was in Alamo Village – Highway 674, Brackettville, Texas, Alpine, Texas, Del Rio, Texas, and Fort Davis, Texas.

Release 
The film debuted on Turner Network Television on March 5, 1995.

Accolades
Sissy Spacek was nominated for a Primetime Emmy Award for Outstanding Supporting Actress in a Miniseries or a Movie at the 47th Primetime Emmy Awards in 1995 but lost to Judy Davis and Shirley Knight, who shared the award as co-winners for two separate TV movies.

References

External links 
 

1995 television films
1995 films
1995 Western (genre) films
Films based on American novels
Films directed by Tommy Lee Jones
Films set in Texas
Films shot in Texas
TNT Network original films
American Western (genre) television films
1990s English-language films